HD 136138, or HR 5692, is a binary star system in the Serpens Caput segment of the Serpens constellation. It has a golden hue like the Sun and is dimly visible to the naked eye with an apparent visual magnitude of 5.68; the light contribution from the companion is effectively negligible. This system is located at a distance of approximately 420 light years from the Sun based on parallax. It is drifting closer with a radial velocity of −7.7 km/s and has a proper motion of ·yr−1.

The radial velocity variation of this star was reported by J. R. de Medeiros and M. Mayor in 1999, and it was confirmed as a binary by A. Frankowski and colleagues in 2007 using proper motion measurements. Proper motion measurements allow an estimate of the orbital inclination angle as ~43°.

The stellar classification of the primary component is G8IIIa, indicating this is a evolved G-type giant star that has exhausted the supply of hydrogen at its core. It is a red clump giant that is generating energy through core helium fusion. There is some ambiguous evidence for this being a mild barium star of class Ba0.3, with the spectra showing marginal overabundances of s-process elements. A low level of X-ray emission has been detected, which appears to be coming from the star's corona.

The high level of ultraviolet flux coming from this system strongly suggests the companion is a compact white dwarf. Mass estimates put it in the range of 0.6 to 0.8 times the mass of the Sun, and the temperature is around 30,400 K. It is possible that the earlier evolution of this component contaminated its partner with s-process elements, although the resulting interaction should have circularized the orbit to some degree. The dwarf has a visual magnitude of 15.3 and a hydrogen-dominated atmospheric class of DA1.7.

References 

G-type giants
Barium stars
Horizontal-branch stars
White dwarfs
Spectroscopic binaries

Serpens (constellation)
5692
BD+21 2755
136138
074896